Percy Schofield (April/May/June 1893 – 20 June 1968) was an English footballer who played as a forward. Born in Bolton, he made one appearance for Manchester United in the Football League, against Preston North End on 1 October 1921. He also played for Eccles United and Hurst.

External links
Profile at StretfordEnd.co.uk
Profile at MUFCInfo.com

1893 births
1968 deaths
People from Bolton
English footballers
Association football forwards
Manchester United F.C. players
Eccles United F.C. players